Shiver is the debut studio album by Australian country music artist Jamie O'Neal. Released on 31 October 2000, the album reached its peak of number 14 on the U.S. Top Country Albums chart and number 125 on the Billboard 200. It was certified Gold by the RIAA for sales of 500,000. The album was released through Mercury Nashville Records. Five singles were released from Shiver, the first two ("There Is No Arizona" and "When I Think About Angels") managed to reach number 1 on the Billboard Hot Country Songs chart.

The album included a duet with Country Singer Mark Wills, who also recorded for Mercury at the time. The track, "I'm Not Gonna Do Anything Without You", was released as a single for Wills, and reached number 31 on the country charts. The song is also available on Wills' studio album, Loving Every Minute.

After the release of this album, O'Neal recorded a second album for Mercury, entitled On My Way to You. Although its lead-off single peaked at number 34 in 2003, the album was not released and O'Neal exited Mercury. She then signed to Capitol Records Nashville to release her next album, Brave (2005).

Critical reception
Rick Cohoon of Allmusic rated the album four stars out of five, praising O'Neal's voice and the first two singles, but said that the rest of the album "lacks the polish of the pros".

Track listing

Personnel

 Brady Barnett – keyboards (tracks 3, 4, 10, 13), Hammond organ (track 4), vibraphone (track 4), drum loops (tracks 2, 7, 10)
 Eddie Bayers – drums (tracks 2-4, 5, 7, 8, 10, 11, 13)
 Bekka Bramlett – background vocals (tracks 1, 4)
 Eric Darken – percussion (all tracks except 2 & 11)
 Roxie Dean – background vocals (tracks 6, 11)
 Mark Douthit – saxophone (track 4)
 Dan Dugmore – steel guitar (track 5)
 Stuart Duncan – fiddle (track 12)
 Paul Franklin – steel guitar (tracks 3, 10)
 Rodney Good – background vocals (tracks 1, 4-9, 11)
 Owen Hale – drums (tracks 1, 6, 9, 12)
 Aubrey Haynie – fiddle (tracks 7, 9), mandolin (tracks 1, 5, 6, 8, 12)
 Dan Hill – background vocals (track 13)
 John Hobbs – keyboards (track 7), piano (tracks 5, 7, 8)
 Jim Hoke – harmonica (track 2)
 Mike Johnson – steel guitar (track 7)
 John Kelton – bass guitar (tracks 2, 11), keyboards (track 3), drum loops (track 2)
 B. James Lowry – acoustic guitar (tracks 1, 3, 4, 6, 7, 10, 13), gut string guitar (track 9)
 Randy McCormick – Hammond organ (tracks 1, 6, 11)
 Brent Mason – electric guitar (all tracks except 13), gut string guitar (track 13)
 Samantha Murphy – background vocals (tracks 5, 7-9, 11)
 Jamie O'Neal – lead vocals (all tracks), background vocals (tracks 1, 2, 4-9, 11, 12)
 Kim Parent – background vocals (track 12)
 Gary Prim – Hammond organ (track 8), piano (tracks 3, 6, 9, 11)
 Michael Rhodes – bass guitar (tracks 5, 7, 8)
 Michael Rojas – piano (track 2)
 Matt Rollings – piano (tracks 4, 12)
 Keith Stegall – acoustic guitar (track 11), electric guitar (track 11), Hammond organ (track 5), synthesizer (tracks 4, 6), keyboards (track 10, 13), drum loops (track 2)
 Biff Watson – acoustic guitar (track 12)
 John D. Willis – mandolin (track 2)
 Mark Wills – duet vocals (track 10)
 Glenn Worf – bass guitar (tracks 1, 3, 4, 6, 9, 10, 12, 13)
 Jonathan Yudkin – cello (track 2)

Strings on "I'm Still Waiting" and "To Be with You" arranged by Matthew McCauley.

Chart performance

Weekly charts

Year-end charts

Singles

Certifications

References

2000 debut albums
Albums produced by Keith Stegall
Mercury Records albums
Jamie O'Neal albums